Australina may refer to:
 Australina (brachiopod), a fossil genus of brachiopods in the family Lissatrypidae
 Australina (plant), a genus of flowering plants in the family Urticaceae
 Australina, a genus of flies in the family Lauxaniidae; synonym of Australinina